The Natchez Trace Parkway Bridge is a concrete double arch bridge located in Williamson County, Tennessee,  from the northern terminus of the Natchez Trace Parkway.

Background 
The bridge, also known as the Natchez Trace Parkway Arches, is the first segmentally constructed concrete arch bridge in the United States. The foundations and piers of the bridge were cast in place.

The bridge is rare in that it does not use spandrel columns to support the deck from the arch. Rather than being evenly distributed along the arch's length, the weight of the bridge is concentrated at the crown of the arch. The lack of spandrel columns results in a clean, unencumbered appearance: it is termed a cathedral arch bridge.
 
The bridge was designed by Figg Engineering Group and built by PCL Civil Constructors Inc., a subsidiary of PCL Constructors Inc. The arches and deck were constructed using a balanced cantilever method. Each arch was supported by temporary cable stays anchored from the top of the piers and the valley sides until it was fully built. This procedure was chosen in place of conventional shoring towers so that environmental damage to the valley would be minimized. The bridge cost US$11.3 million to build, and was completed in October 1993. It was officially opened on March 22, 1994.
 
The bridge has won many awards for its design, including a Presidential Award for Design Excellence in 1995, and an Award of Merit from the Federal Highway Administration in 1996. The Eleventh International Bridge Conference named it the single most outstanding achievement in the bridge industry for 1994. The bridge "impressed the... jury with its aesthetically striking double-arch design, which shows exceptional sensitivity to the historical context of the site."

The bridge is on the album artwork for the Christian rock band Newsboys, featured on their 2004 studio album Devotion.

Suicide Bridge 

Between 2000 and 2022, 42 people died by suicide at the Natchez Trace Parkway and New Hwy 96 bridge. Suicide prevention signs were posted in 2011, but the deaths continued. The Natchez Trace Bridge Barrier Coalition was formed in September 2018 to work with federal congressional delegates and the National Park Service to install a suicide prevention barrier. On August 16, 2022 a barrier of chain link and barbed wire was installed along both sides of the bridge to raise the existing 32 inch railing and increase deterrence.

See also
Suicide Bridges
Suicide Sites

Gallery

References

Cathedral arch bridges
Bridges completed in 1993
Landmarks in Tennessee
Natchez Trace
Buildings and structures in Williamson County, Tennessee
Road bridges in Tennessee
1993 establishments in Tennessee
Arch bridges in the United States
Concrete bridges in the United States